is a 2013 Japanese science fiction anime television series based on Sunrise's long-running Gundam franchise. The series is directed by Kenji Nagasaki of No. 6 and written by Yousuke Kuroda of Mobile Suit Gundam 00. Character designs were done by both Kenichi Ohnuki and Suzuhito Yasuda. The series was first unveiled under the name "1/144 Gundam Mobile" project by Sunrise, before its official announcement. In contrast to other Gundam series, Gundam Build Fighters focuses on the Gundam model (Gunpla) aspect of the franchise. The first opening theme  by Back-On, and the ending theme "Imagination > Reality" by AiRI were used from episodes 2 to 13. From episodes 14 to 24, "wimp" by Back-On featuring Lil' Fang (from FAKY) was the opening theme while  by Hyadain became the ending theme from episodes 14 to 25.

Episode list

References

Gundam Build Fighters
Build Fighters